Rafik Sorman Stadium is a multi-purpose stadium in Sorman, Libya.  It is currently used mostly for football matches and is the home ground of Rafik Sorman.  The stadium holds a maximum of 8,000 people.

References

Football venues in Libya
Multi-purpose stadiums in Libya
Sorman